Group 3 Films was a short lived British film production company that operated from 1951 to 1955.

Background
It was set up by the NFFC to help finance movies from newer filmmakers. Its films were to be distributed by ABFD  and mostly financed by the NFFC with ABFD to make up the balance of finance. Michael Balcon and James Lawrie sat on the board and the company was run by John Grierson and John Baxter. 

They produced over 20 films and lost half a million pounds before the NFFC brought the company to a halt.

Critical appraisal
FilmInk wrote "are there any decent Group 3 pictures?"

Select Films
Judgment Deferred (1951) - directed by John Baxter starring Joan Collins
Brandy for the Parson (1951) - directed by John Eldridge starring Kenneth More
Time Gentlemen Please! (1952) - directed by Lewis Gilbert
You're Only Young Twice (1952) - directed by Terry Bishop
The Brave Don't Cry (1952) - directed by Philip Leacock starring John Gregson
Miss Robin Hood (1952) - directed by John Guillermin starring Margaret Rutherford
The Oracle (1952) - directed by C. M. Pennington-Richards
Laxdale Hall (1952) - directed by John Eldridge
Child's Play (1952) - directed by Margaret Thomson, written by Don Sharp
The Nutcracker (1952) (short) - directed by Cyril Frankel
Man of Africa (1953) - directed by Cyril Frankel
Background (1953) aka Edge of Divorce - written by Don Sharp, directed by Daniel Lowe
The Conquest of Everest (1953) (documentary) directed by George Lowe
The Angel Who Pawned Her Harp (1953) - directed by Alan Bromly starring Diane Cilento
Devil on Horseback (1954) - directed by Cyril Frankel
Conflict of Wings (1954) aka Fuss Over Feathers - directed by John Elddridge, written by Don Sharp, starring Kieron Moore and Edwin Richfield
The End of the Road (1954) - directed by Wolf Rilla
Orders are Orders (1954) - directed by David Paltenghi
Make Me an Offer (1954) - directed by Cyril Frankel from debut novel of Wolf Mankowitz starring Peter Finch in his first solo lead
Doublecross (1954) aka Queer Fish
The Love Match (1954) - directed by David Paltenghi starring Arthur Askey
The Blue Peter (1955) - directed by Wolf Rilla, written by Don Sharp, starring Kieron Moore and Edwin Richfield
John and Julie (1955) - directed by William Fairchild
Tensing's Country (1955) (documentary)
The Challenge of the North (1955) (documentary)

References

Notes

External links
Group 3 at BFI
Group 3 at British Films

Film production companies of the United Kingdom
Defunct film and television production companies of the United Kingdom